The Rocks District of Milton-Freewater AVA (The Rocks District) is an American Viticultural Area that is a sub-appellation of the Walla Walla Valley AVA, which itself is a sub-appellation of the Columbia Valley AVA.

It is named for the city of Milton-Freewater, Oregon, and a unique alluvial fan resulting in rocky soils with "baseball sized" basalt cobbles covering the earth, and is notable as being "the only AVA in the United States whose boundaries are defined by the soil type". Unique wine flavors are said to result from the mineral composition, hydrology, and temperatures of the volcanic rocks.

History
Washington State geologist and terroir consultant Kevin Pogue submitted the proposal for the new AVA to the U.S. government.  The AVA was published for comment in the Federal Register in February 2014, and was established in February 2015.

Controversies
The AVA, unlike the Walla Walla Valley AVA, and the Walla Walla Valley itself, lies entirely within the state of Oregon. This has implications for use of the appellation on wines produced in Oregon and Washington. Because Federal rules require wines to be fully finished in the state in which the AVA lies, only a handful of Oregon wineries, out of the more than 100 wineries in both states in the Walla Walla Valley, would be permitted to use the appellation on their product. At the same time, Oregon wineries as far away as Portland could use the appellation. This has caused some, labeled "prominent dissenters" by Wine Spectator'''s Harvey Steiman, to oppose the AVA. Other reactions were less pointed with wine publishers using terms like "a bit of controversy" and "the location...creates some nuances". One of the same publishers said a "sub-appellation was ... inevitable given the uniqueness of the soils and resulting wines".

Critical receptionWine Spectator'''s two top-rated Northwest wines , both Syrahs, and both of which scored 98 out of 100, were from the AVA.

Footnotes

References

Sources

Further reading

External links
 
Federal Register: Notice of proposed rulemaking
Government docket TTB-2014-0003 including proposed AVA maps and other documents
Federal Register: Establishment of The Rocks District of Milton-Freewater Viticultural Area

American Viticultural Areas
2015 establishments in Oregon
Oregon wine
Geography of Umatilla County, Oregon